Miklós Németh (born 23 October 1946) is a Hungarian Olympic champion and former World Record holder in the javelin throw. Born in Budapest, he is the son of Imre Németh, who won the Olympic gold in the hammer throw at the 1948 Summer Olympics.

Németh's winning effort at the 1976 Summer Olympics in Montreal was also a world record for the event. His mark of 94.58 meters came in the first round of throwing, completely demoralizing Németh's dazed competitors. Silver medalist Hannu Siitonen of Finland, whose record, thrown in June 1973, was 93.90 meters, could do no better than 87.92 — more than 6.5 meters (nearly 22 feet) behind Németh. He was elected Hungarian Sportsman of the Year for his achievement.

Németh's gold medal performance stood as the global standard in the javelin until 23 April 1980, when fellow Hungarian Ferenc Paragi launched the spear 96.72 meters.

References

External links
 

1946 births
Living people
Hungarian male javelin throwers
Olympic athletes of Hungary
Olympic gold medalists for Hungary
Olympic gold medalists in athletics (track and field)
Athletes (track and field) at the 1968 Summer Olympics
Athletes (track and field) at the 1972 Summer Olympics
Athletes (track and field) at the 1976 Summer Olympics
Athletes (track and field) at the 1980 Summer Olympics
Medalists at the 1976 Summer Olympics
Universiade medalists in athletics (track and field)
Universiade gold medalists for Hungary
Athletes from Budapest
Medalists at the 1970 Summer Universiade
20th-century Hungarian people
21st-century Hungarian people